Live in New York is a live album by American jazz guitarist Sonny Sharrock which was recorded in 1989 and released on the Enemy label.

Reception

AllMusic awarded the album 2½ stars, stating, "If what you're after is an above-average bar band with an at times amazing guitarist and a consistently solid rhythm section, Live in New York will do just fine. Listeners who came to expect something on a more inspired level will have to content themselves with nearly contemporary albums like his solo venture (also on Enemy) or the stellar Ask the Ages".

Track listing

Personnel 
Adapted from the Live in New York liner notes.

Musicians
 Pheeroan Aklaff – drums
 Ron "The Burglar" Cartel - vocals
 Melvin Gibbs – bass guitar
 Sonny Sharrock – guitar, production
 Dave Snider
 – keyboards
 Abe Speller – drums

Production and additional personnel
 Michael Knuth – co-producer
 Francis Manzella – engineer

Release history

References

External links 
 

1989 live albums
Sonny Sharrock albums
Enemy Records live albums
Albums recorded at the Knitting Factory